Ems or EMS may refer to:

Places and rivers 
 Domat/Ems, a Swiss municipality in the canton of Grisons
 Ems (river) (Eems), a river in northwestern Germany and northeastern Netherlands that discharges in the Dollart Bay
 Ems (Eder), a river of Hesse, Germany, a tributary of the Eder
 River Ems (Chichester Harbour), an English river with its mouth at Emsworth, Hampshire
 Bad Ems, a German town in Rhineland-Palatinate, until 1913 named Ems

Businesses 
 Eastern Mountain Sports, an outdoor retailer
 Eitzen Maritime Services, a Norwegian company
 Electronic Music Studios, a manufacturer of synthesizers
 Elektromreža Srbije, a Serbian electric utility company
 Event Marketing Solutions, a UK-based provider of vehicle-based marketing roadshows
 Ems-Chemie, Swiss chemical company
 EMS (pharmaceuticals), a Brazilian pharmaceutical company
 EMS Technologies, an American company

Organizations 
 Edinburgh Mathematical Society
 Environmental Media Services, an American nonprofit organization
 European Monetary System, a former European monetary cooperation
 European Mathematical Society

Schools

United States 
 Eagleview Middle School, El Paso County, Colorado
 Eastern Middle School, Montgomery County, Maryland
 Elwood Middle School, New York
 Penn State College of Earth and Mineral Sciences (commonly referred to as EMS), part of Penn State University, University Park, Pennsylvania
 Eastern Mennonite School, Harrisonburg, Virginia
 Eastern Mennonite Seminary, Harrisonburg, Virginia

Elsewhere 
 Earl Marriott Secondary School, Surrey, British Columbia, Canada
 English Martyrs School and Sixth Form College, Hartlepool, County Durham, England
 Exeter Mathematics School, Exeter, Devon, England
 EM Strasbourg Business School, Strasbourg, France

Science and technology

Physics, chemistry, and biology 
 Electromagnetic suspension, a method to suspend an object
 Electromagnetic spectrum, is the range of all possible electromagnetic radiation
 Ethyl methanesulfonate (or methanesulfonic acid ethyl ester), a mutagen
 European macroseismic scale, a scale used when measuring earthquakes intensity
 Environmental Mutagen Society

Computer and engineering 
 Electronics manufacturing services, a type of company
 Electronic meeting system, a collaborative computer software
 Element management system, software to monitor and control network elements (devices) in telecommunications
 Emergency Management Services, a part of MS-Windows
 Energy management software, software to monitor and optimize energy consumption in buildings or communities
 Energy management system, a system to control, monitor, and optimize the generation and flow of Electric Power
 Engine management system, see engine control unit
 Enhanced Messaging Service, an extension to Short Message Service (SMS) for mobile phone
 Expanded Memory Specification, a memory specification for x86 PCs supported by DOS etc.
 Enterprise messaging system, a middleware system for sending messages between two or more clients
 Execution management system, a trading system with a user interface for market data, indicators and order entry

Medical and veterinary 
 Emergency medical services, a service providing out-of-hospital acute care and transport
 Eosinophilia–myalgia syndrome, a neurological condition
 Electrical muscle stimulation, a type of medical therapy, also referred to as Electro Myo-Stimulation, a technique used in sports training and rehabilitation
 Equine metabolic syndrome, a horse disease

Other science and technology 
 Earthen manure storage, structures for the storage of liquid livestock manure
 Environmental management system, part of a management system of an organization similar to a quality management system
 Engine monitoring system, data logging, display and alerting device, a simpler form of an aircraft engine-indicating and crew-alerting system
 Expected mean squares, in statistics

Other uses 
 Ems (ship), an 1893 British iron sailing ship
 Express Mail Service, an international express postal service offered by members of the Universal Postal Union
 Experimental Music Studios, computer music center at the University of Illinois
 E. M. S. Namboodiripad (1909–1998), Indian communist leader
 Expeditionary Medical Ship (U.S. Navy)

See also 
 Ems Dispatch, a historical document
 EM (disambiguation)